I Like The Way You Move may refer to the following:

 "I Like the Way (You Move)", a 2005 single by the BodyRockers
 "I Like The Way You Move", a 2013 dance track with Pattie Brooks
 "I Like the Way You Move", an episode of the American TV series Transamerican Love Story
 I Like the Way You Move, 2021 British dating series

See also
 "The Way You Move", a 2003 single by OutKast